Mirza Ahmed mosque — is a mosque of 1345. It is located in Baku, the capital of Azerbaijan, in the historical part of the city - Icherisheher, on the Mirza Alakbar Sabir Str., in a row with residential buildings. It was built by Haji Mirza Ahmed.

Architecture 
On plan, the mosque has a quadrangular shape. It consists of a square vestibule, a service room and a prayer hall with niches. The architectural structure of the mosque has domes made of
local stone and pointed arches.

In the centre of the entrance door there is an inscription from Koran, as well as the name of the architect. The roof of the mosque, as well as the adjacent auxiliary premises, were destroyed. There is an assumption that the mosque was built on the site of an older temple.

See also
Gileyli Mosque
Chin Mosque
Khidir Mosque

References

Monuments and memorials in Azerbaijan
Mosques in Baku
Icherisheher